In Koli Jean Bofane (born 24 October 1954 in Mbandaka in what is now the Democratic Republic of the Congo) is a Congolese writer.

Life and work
Bofane was born in Équateur province in 1954; his mother left his father for a Belgian settler and he grew up mainly on his stepfather's coffee plantation. After independence in 1960, they lost everything and had to leave the country for their safety, travelling to Belgium from where Bofane made constant return trips to the Congo as he grew up. He established himself in Kinshasa where he worked in advertising and founded a publishing company, Les Publications de l'Exocet.

He finally left the country permanently in 1993, settling in Brussels. His first book, a children's story published in 1996, won a major Belgian literary prize and he went to win acclaim with his first novel, Mathematiques Congolaises in 2008.

Bibliography
 Pourquoi le lion n'est plus le roi des animaux, Gallimard, 1996
 Bibi et les Canards, 2000
 Mathématiques congolaises, Actes Sud, 2008
 Congo Inc. : Le testament de Bismarck, Actes Sud, 2014, Grand prix du roman métis

References

1954 births
Democratic Republic of the Congo novelists
20th-century novelists
Living people
21st-century Democratic Republic of the Congo people